Meñakoz is a beach situated on the north coast of the Basque Country, Spain, in the towns of Sopelana and Barrika, due north of the city of Bilbao.

This stony beach is less well-known or accessible than other beaches in the area, and as such is less frequented. It is, however, well known to surfers, and is reputed to have Europe's biggest waves, often swelling to 6 m. A very dangerous surfing beach, it is best left to expert surfers.

See also
Mundaka, Biarritz, and Hendaye are surfing spots in neighbour areas.

External links
Beach wizard Meñakoz surf page

Geography of Biscay
Surfing locations
Beaches of the Basque Country (autonomous community)